Xavier Malisse was the defending champion, but lost in the first round to Bobby Reynolds.  

Kei Nishikori won his first ATP title at 3–6, 6–1, 6–4, against James Blake.

Seeds

Draw

Finals

Top half

Bottom half

External links
 Main Draw
 Qualifying draw

Singles

nl:ATP-toernooi van Delray Beach 2008